Judson Hall (October 22, 1855 – November 25, 1938) was an American educator and politician.

Born in Merton, Waukesha County, Wisconsin, Hall grew up on a farm. He then taught school. Judd served as Hartland town clerk. He also served as president and supervisor of the village of Hartland, Wisconsin. He was elected county clerk for Waukesha County and was a Democrat. In 1913, Hall served in the Wisconsin State Assembly. Hall died in Hartland, Wisconsin.

Notes

1855 births
1938 deaths
People from Merton, Wisconsin
Educators from Wisconsin
Farmers from Wisconsin
County clerks in Wisconsin
Mayors of places in Wisconsin
Wisconsin city council members
People from Hartland, Wisconsin
Democratic Party members of the Wisconsin State Assembly